The ribeirinhos are a traditional population in South America, who live near rivers. Their main activities are fishing and farming on a small scale, for their own use. They usually live in pile dwelling and travel by motor boats called voadeiras.

According to the Joshua Project, there are approximately 7,105,000 ribeirinho people in Brazil. The Brazilian government has formally recognized their existence since 2007.

See also
Cholos pescadores
Montubio
Caiçaras
Indigenous peoples in Brazil

References

Ethnic groups in Brazil
Rivers